Stagonospora recedens is a fungal plant pathogen infecting red clover.

References

External links 
 Index Fungorum
 USDA ARS Fungal Database

Fungal plant pathogens and diseases
Pleosporales
Fungi described in 1938